WJAS (1320 AM) is a commercial radio station in Pittsburgh, Pennsylvania. The station has a talk radio format, and uses the slogan "The Talk of Pittsburgh". It is owned by St. Barnabas Broadcasting, a division of the Saint Barnabas Health System, with studios and offices on Fleet Street in Green Tree.

The transmitter site is off Highland Drive in the Highland Park neighborhood of Pittsburgh. WJAS broadcasts with 7,000 watts non-directional by day. At night, to avoid interfering with other stations on 1320 AM, it reduces power to 3,300 watts and uses a directional antenna. 

Programming is also heard on a 99-watt FM translator, W256DE, at 99.1 MHz.

Programming
WJAS is partially programmed by iHeartMedia under a master services agreement, with St. Barnabas retaining authority over personnel decisions.

Weekdays begin with a morning drive time show hosted by David Blomquist ("Bloomdaddy"), a veteran Pittsburgh broadcaster. It is simulcast with WWVA (1170 AM) in Wheeling, West Virginia. Nationally syndicated conservative talk shows fill the rest of the schedule: Glenn Beck, Rose Somma Tennant, Sean Hannity, Dave Ramsey, Mark Levin, Coast to Coast AM with George Noory and This Morning, America's First News with Gordon Deal.

Weekends feature shows on money, health, car repair and technology.  Weekend syndicated hosts include Joe Pags, Kim Komando and Bill Cunningham.  Some weekend hours are paid brokered programming.  Most hours begin with news from Fox News Radio.

WJAS is the home to University of Pittsburgh Panthers women's basketball games as well as Duquesne Dukes football and men's basketball games.

History

Early years
Effective December 1, 1921, the Commerce Department, which regulated radio at this time, adopted regulations formally defining "broadcasting stations". The wavelength of 360 meters (833 kHz) was designated for entertainment broadcasts, while 485 meters (619 kHz) was reserved for broadcasting official weather and other government reports. Because there was only one available "entertainment" wavelength, stations in a given region had to develop timesharing agreements, in order to assign exclusive timeslots for broadcasting on 360 meters.

WJAS was first licensed on August 4, 1922 to the Pittsburgh Radio Supply House, operating on 360 meters. It was Pittsburgh's sixth AM broadcasting station authorization. The call letters were randomly assigned from a sequential roster of available call signs. 

WJAS carried NBC's dramas, comedies, news and sports during the last years of the Golden Age of Radio. During the 1930s and 1940s, WJAS was home to the Wilkens Amateur Hour. Sponsored by Wilkens Jewelry Company, a 1942 review in the trade publication Billboard said the show "remains Pittsburgh's most popular local program".

On November 1, 1957 the National Broadcasting Company (NBC) gained control of WJAS and WJAS-FM, adding them to their roster of network owned-and-operated stations. Later that month the call letters were changed to WAMP and WFMP, which was derived from "AM and FM Pittsburgh". Three years later, both stations changed back to their original call letters.

Top 40 era
In 1973, the station became popular with a new format as Top 40 WKPQ, later WKTQ, using the branding "13Q", under new owners Heftel Communications. A promotion was run where listeners would win prizes if they were randomly telephoned and answered with "I listen to the new sound of 13Q" (instead of "hello").  The Top 40 years were the highest-rated ever for the station, ranking second in the Arbitron ratings behind only  KDKA.

As young listeners moved to FM for music, the WKTQ's ratings began to fade. In 1977, Heftel sold the station to Nationwide Communications, which tried an adult contemporary format, which was also unsuccessful.

Adult standards
Nationwide sold the station to Beni Broadcasting, which switched the station to an adult standards format and brought back the WJAS call letters in 1981. Beni eventually sold WJAS to Renda Broadcasting. WJAS was one of the top standards stations in the United States.  The format of Frank Sinatra, Nat King Cole and Barbra Streisand continued for three decades.

WJAS boasted of two personalities with long and storied histories in Pittsburgh media: Jack Bogut and Bill "Chilly Billy" Cardille.

In August 2014, Renda Broadcasting sold WJAS to Pittsburgh Radio Partners LLC, a company controlled by Frank Iorio, Jr. The sale, at a price of $1 million, was consummated on August 1, 2014.  It was Iorio's first radio station purchase in Pittsburgh, as his other stations were all based in Warren. Iorio put the Warren stations up for sale in 2017, finding a buyer in Lilly Broadcasting in 2019.

Talk radio
As expected, at noon on August 7, 2014, the new owner changed the station to a conservative talk format in response to rumors that WPGB would flip formats from talk to country music. The final song played under the standards format was "One More for the Road" by Frank Sinatra.

WJAS then began carrying most of the programs previously heard on WPGB (a station that directed its listeners to WJAS as it prepared to change formats).  The first program to air on the talk-formatted WJAS was The Rush Limbaugh Show. WJAS did not choose to carry WPGB's signature morning drive program "Quinn and Rose", which returned to the Pittsburgh radio market on WBGG in 2018, but eventually hired Rose Somma-Tennent to replace Limbaugh in March 2021, a month after Limbaugh's death. Former Pittsburgh TV news anchor Wendy Bell hosted from 9 a.m. to noon from January to May 2021, before an unresolved and unspecified "personnel matter" prompted the ownership to cancel Bell's show. Somma-Tennent was unexpectedly fired from the station in late June in favor of Dan Bongino.

WJAS began running a morning drive show hosted by David Blomquist ("Bloomdaddy"), produced at WWVA in Wheeling, West Virginia.

In November 2020, Iorio exited radio and sold WJAS and translator W256DE to St. Barnabas Health System for $2.05 million. The sale was consummated on January 13, 2021.

References

External links
 

FCC History Cards for WJAS (covering 1927-1981 as WJAS / WAMP / WKPQ / WKTQ)
Tribute to 13Q by Jeff Roteman

JAS
News and talk radio stations in the United States
Radio stations established in 1922
1922 establishments in Pennsylvania
Radio stations licensed before 1923 and still broadcasting